Open Universities Australia (OUA) is an online higher education organisation based in Australia. The organisation was previously known as the Open Learning Agency of Australia. The chairman is Professor Bruce S. Dowton and the chief executive officer is Stuart Elmslie.

Seven Australian-based universities control the ownership of the organisation. A board of directors, consisting of nominees from the universities which own the organisation, governs OUA. There are also up to five independent directors on the board at any one time.

While the majority of enrolled students are based in Australia, courses are available to students globally. Most undergraduate courses offered have no first-year entry requirements and there are no quotas for most courses.

Through OUA, students can enrol in hundreds of qualifications online, which are provided by Australian universities and other education providers.

Partnerships
Current online education providers:
 Australian Catholic University
 Australian National University
 Bond University
 Charles Sturt University
 Curtin University
 DeakinCo 
 Edith Cowan University
 Flinders University
 Griffith University
 James Cook University
 La Trobe University
 Macquarie University
 Murdoch University
 RMIT University
 Southern Cross University 
 Swinburne University of Technology 
 The University of Adelaide 
 The University of Newcastle 
 University of New England
 University of New South Wales
 University of South Australia
 University of Tasmania

OUA is a member of the Elite Athlete Friendly University program (EAFU). A key factor in being part of EAFU is for the partner to support athletes to achieve academic excellence and recognise the challenges athletes face when combining education, career and a personal life with a high-performance sporting career.

Professional athletes studying through OUA come from a range of sports including all football codes, tennis, athletics and diving.

OUA also has partnerships with several Australian public and private organizations such as National Australia Bank, Westpac Group and the Commonwealth Department of Defence.

History
Open Universities Australia was formed as the Open Learning Agency of Australia Pty Ltd (OLAA or OLA) in late 1993 as a private company.

The organisation was originally owned by Monash University. In order to provide equal access to students across Australia's regional areas, they created a partnership with the Australian Broadcasting Corporation and eight other universities. At this time, the federal government provided funding for the project.

In 2004, OLA changed its name to Open Universities Australia (OUA), reflecting the changing demands and expectation of its students. In the same year, OUA students gained access to the new FEE-HELP scheme. FEE-HELP provides eligible students with deferred payment options for undergraduate and postgraduate units and courses and remains a popular option with OUA students.

In June 2012, IBM used the organisation as an IT case study after implementing a new IT strategy. The move was aimed at supporting student performance and retention, while also giving the organisation an insight into marketing and sales options.

In December 2012, the organisation placed a bid for a top level domain, .courses. The bid was made in a lottery draw, held by Assigned Names and Numbers (ICANN) to help assign new generic top-level domains.

Open2Study was launched in March 2013 as a teaching, learning and assessment platform. It enabled universities to offer free courses online. It competed with global online learning platform providers such as Coursera and EdX. Open2Study closed in 2019.

In July 2013, OUA acquired a 100 per cent interest in Interact Learning Pty Ltd, trading as e3Learning, an Australian online training and compliance provider based in Adelaide. Founded in 2001, e3Learning has 250 corporate customers across Australia, the United Kingdom and New Zealand and employs more than 70 staff. The City & Guilds Group acquired e3Learning from OUA in 2017.

In December 2013, OUA launched Open Training Institute, a Registered Training Organisation (RTO) offering online Vocational Education and Training (VET). The Institute closed in 2017.

References

External links

 
Universities in Australia
Companies based in Melbourne
Organizations established in 1993
Curtin University
Griffith University
Macquarie University
Monash University
RMIT University
Swinburne University of Technology
University of South Australia